Two qualifying rounds comprised the first stage of the 1998–99 UEFA Champions League, the 44th season of Europe's premier club football competition and the seventh since it was rebranded as the UEFA Champions League. The stage determined which 16 teams joined the eight automatic qualifiers in the group stage. 32 teams entered at the first qualifying round, with a further 16 teams receiving a bye to the second qualifying round. Among the teams in the first qualifying round was Ukrainian side Dynamo Kyiv, who went on to reach the semi-finals of the competition proper, while both finalists – Manchester United of England and Bayern Munich of Germany – entered the competition in the second qualifying round, having finished as runners-up in their domestic leagues the previous season.

First qualifying round

Seeding
32 champions from associations ranked 16–48 (except Liechtenstein) started in First qualifying round. Champions of nations ranked 16–31 were seeded, while champions of nations ranked 32 and below were unseeded. The draw was performed on 6 July 1998 in Geneva, Switzerland.

Summary

|}
 Match forfeited

Matches

Club Brugge won 2–1 on aggregate.

ŁKS Łódź won 7–2 on aggregate.

Litex Lovech won 3–2 on aggregate.

Grasshopper won 8–0 on aggregate.

Celtic won 2–0 on aggregate.

Maribor won 4–0 on aggregate.

Dynamo Kyiv won 10–1 on aggregate.

Košice won 13–1 on aggregate.

Skonto won 2–1 on aggregate.

Anorthosis won 8–0 on aggregate.

Beitar Jerusalem won 5–1 on aggregate.

The first leg was finished 1–0 after normal time, but later awarded 3–0 by default. Dinamo Tbilisi won 4–3 on aggregate.

HJK won 5–0 on aggregate.

FK Obilić won 4–1 on aggregate.

Újpest won 3–2 on aggregate.

Steaua București won 5–4 on aggregate.

Second qualifying round

Seeding
16 clubs (champions of nations ranked 8–15 and runners-up of nations ranked 1–8) started in this round and were seeded. 16 winners of the First qualifying round were unseeded. Losing teams in the second qualifying round qualified for the first round of the 1998–99 UEFA Cup. The draw was performed on 6 July 1998 in Geneva, Switzerland, immediately after First qualifying round draw.

Notes

Summary

|}

 Played at Neftochimik Stadium in Burgas because Litex Lovech's Lovech Stadium in Lovech did not meet UEFA standards.
 Played at Arena Garibaldi in Pisa because Internazionale were temporarily banned from playing at their San Siro stadium in Milan.
 Played at Tsirion Stadium in Limassol because Anorthosis' Antonis Papadopoulos Stadium in Larnaca did not meet UEFA standards.

Matches

4–4 on aggregate; Rosenborg won on away goals.

Manchester United won 2–0 on aggregate.

Spartak Moscow won 11–2 on aggregate.

Galatasaray won 5–3 on aggregate.

Croatia Zagreb won 3–1 on aggregate.

PSV Eindhoven won 5–3 on aggregate.

1–1 on aggregate; Dynamo Kyiv won on penalties.

Brøndby won 2–1 on aggregate.

Internazionale won 7–1 on aggregate.

Olympiacos won 6–3 on aggregate.

Benfica won 8–4 on aggregate.

2–2 on aggregate; Athletic Bilbao won on away goals.

HJK won 2–1 on aggregate.

Bayern Munich won 5–1 on aggregate.

Sturm Graz won 7–2 on aggregate.

Panathinaikos won 8–5 on aggregate.

References

qualifying rounds
1998-99